Erannis is a geometer moth genus of the subfamily Ennominae erected by Jacob Hübner in 1825. It is placed by some entomologists in the tribe Erannini as the type genus, but others merge this group into the tribe Boarmiini or Bistonini.

The adults of these smallish moths typically live in the crowns of their host trees. The genus is most diverse in the Holarctic; few of the twelve or so known species occur in adjacent regions.

Selected species
Erannis species include:
 Erannis ankeraria (Staudinger, 1861)
 Erannis caspica László, 2003
 Erannis declinans (Staudinger, 1879)
 Erannis defoliaria (Clerck, 1759) – mottled umber
 Erannis golda Djakonov, 1929
 Erannis jacobsoni Djakonov, 1926
 Erannis kashmirensis László, 2003
 Erannis potopolskii Viidalepp, 1988
 Erannis tiliaria (Harris, 1841) – linden looper, winter moth
 Erannis vancouverensis Hulst, 1896 (sometimes in E. tiliaria)

Synonyms
The genus has also been listed under the following now-obsolete alternate names:
 Chimadia Speyer, 1839
 Erranis (lapsus)
 Hibernia (lapsus)
 Hyberna (lapsus)
 Hybernia Berthold, 1827
 Lampetia Stephens, 1827
 Thriptera Gistel, 1848 (non Solier, 1836: preoccupied)

Footnotes

References
  (2003): New species of the genus Erannis Hübner, [1825] 1816 from the North-West Himalaya and Iran (Lepidoptera, Geometridae). Acta Zoologica Academiae Scientiarum Hungaricae 49 (2): 153-158. PDF fulltext
  (2004): Butterflies and Moths of the World, Generic Names and their Type-species – Erannis. Version of November 5, 2004. Retrieved January 12, 2011.
  (2001): Markku Savela's Lepidoptera and some other life forms – Erannis. Version of December 9, 2001. Retrieved January 12, 2011.

Bistonini
Taxa named by Jacob Hübner